The Grove Primary School is a school from pre-primary to Grade 7 in Claremont, Cape Town, Western Cape, South Africa.

There are about 720 pupils at the Grove and the acting school Head is Mr. Abe Louis.

History
The Grove is one of the oldest schools in South Africa and was founded in 1885 as the Feldhausen School, named after Feldhausen Estate, which was a farm prior to the founding of the school. The school is still adjacent to Feldhausen Road.

The premises contain the Sir John Frederick William Herschel obelisk, dedicated to the famous British astronomer who visited  South Africa in 1833 to catalogue the stars of the southern skies, returning to Britain in 1838.

The school celebrated its 125 birthday in 2010. The school celebrates it with musical concerts and a soccer festival, which still runs to date.

Helen Zille, controversial  leader of the DA, started her political career while a parent at the school. She spearheaded a campaign which resulted in the school taking the government to court.
The former principal, Sally Shield, retired after financial misconduct allegations.

Sports 
Grove has one field on the grounds with another field not too far away named Lady Anne (after Lady Anne Barnard). Grove's facilities include a swimming pool, tennis courts, an AstroTurf, netball courts, a playing field, basketball court, cricket nets, a library and a computer room. Every year there is a sports day, competed between the school houses of Athens (red), Sparta (green), Troy (blue) and Rome (yellow).

Summer sports include: mini-sport, mini-cricket, cricket, swimming and tennis.
Winter sports include: soccer, hockey, netball and cross-country.

References

External links
 

Schools in Cape Town
Educational institutions established in 1885
1885 establishments in the British Empire